In mathematics, a permutation polynomial (for a given ring) is a polynomial that acts as a permutation of the elements of the ring, i.e. the map  is a bijection.  In case the ring is a finite field, the Dickson polynomials, which are closely related to the Chebyshev polynomials, provide examples. Over a finite field, every function, so in particular every permutation of the elements of that field, can be written as a polynomial function.

In the case of finite rings Z/nZ, such polynomials have also been studied and applied in the interleaver component of error detection and correction algorithms.

Single variable permutation polynomials over finite fields
Let  be the finite field of characteristic , that is, the field having  elements where  for some prime .

 the function  is onto (surjective);
 the function  is one-to-one (injective);

A characterization of which polynomials are permutation polynomials is given by

(Hermite's Criterion)  is a permutation polynomial of  if and only if the following two conditions hold:

There are many open questions concerning permutation polynomials defined over finite fields.

Small degree
Hermite's criterion is computationally intensive and can be difficult to use in making theoretical conclusions. However, Dickson was able to use it to find all permutation polynomials of degree at most five over all finite fields. These results are:

Some classes of permutation polynomials
Beyond the above examples, the following list, while not exhaustive, contains almost all of the known major classes of permutation polynomials over finite fields.

These can also be obtained from the recursion

The first few Dickson polynomials are:

If  and  then  permutes GF(q) if and only if . If  then  and the previous result holds.
This condition can be expressed algebraically as 

The linearized polynomials that are permutation polynomials over  form a group under the operation of composition modulo , which is known as the Betti-Mathieu group, isomorphic to the general linear group .
 Only a few other specific classes of permutation polynomials over  have been characterized. Two of these, for example, are:  where  divides , and  where  divides .

Exceptional polynomials

(See Schur's conjecture below).

Geometric examples

In finite geometry coordinate descriptions of certain point sets can provide examples of permutation polynomials of higher degree. In particular, the points forming an oval in a finite projective plane,  with  a power of 2, can be coordinatized in such a way that the relationship between the coordinates is given by an o-polynomial, which is a special type of permutation polynomial over the finite field .

Computational complexity
The problem of testing whether a given polynomial over a finite field is a permutation polynomial can be solved in polynomial time.

Permutation polynomials in several variables over finite fields

Quadratic permutation polynomials (QPP) over finite rings 

For the finite ring Z/nZ one can construct quadratic permutation polynomials. Actually it is possible if and only if n is divisible by p2 for some prime number p. The construction is surprisingly simple, nevertheless it can produce permutations with certain good properties. That is why it has been used in the interleaver component of turbo codes in 3GPP Long Term Evolution mobile telecommunication standard (see 3GPP technical specification 36.212  e.g. page 14 in version 8.8.0).

Simple examples 

Consider  for the ring Z/4Z.
One sees:    
so the polynomial defines the permutation

Consider the same polynomial  for the other ring Z/8Z.
One sees:         so the polynomial defines the permutation

Rings Z/pkZ 

Consider  for the ring Z/pkZ.

Lemma: for k=1 (i.e. Z/pZ) such polynomial defines a permutation only in the case a=0 and b not equal to zero. So the polynomial is not quadratic, but linear.

Rings Z/nZ 

Consider , where pt are prime numbers.

Lemma: any polynomial  defines a permutation for the ring Z/nZ if and only if all the polynomials  defines the permutations for all rings , where  are remainders of  modulo .

As a corollary one can construct plenty quadratic permutation polynomials using the following simple construction. 
Consider , assume that k1 >1.

Consider , such that , but ; assume that , i > 1. And assume that  for all .
(For example, one can take  and ).
Then such polynomial defines a permutation.

To see this we observe that for all primes pi, i > 1, the reduction of this quadratic polynomial modulo pi is actually linear polynomial and hence is permutation by trivial reason. For the first prime number we should use the lemma discussed previously to see that it defines the permutation.

For example, consider  and polynomial .
It defines a permutation

Higher degree polynomials over finite rings

Schur's conjecture
Let K be an algebraic number field with R the ring of integers.  The term "Schur's conjecture" refers to the assertion that, if a polynomial f defined over K is a permutation polynomial on R/P for infinitely many prime ideals P, then f is the composition of Dickson polynomials, degree-one polynomials, and polynomials of the form xk.  In fact, Schur did not make any conjecture in this direction.  The notion that he did is due to Fried, who gave a flawed proof of a false version of the result.  Correct proofs have been given by Turnwald and Müller.

Notes

References
  
  
 
   Chapter 7.
  Chapter 8.
 

Polynomials
Permutations